Vidovdan is a cassette and album by Ensemble Renaissance, released in 1989 on the PGP RTB label. It is their second album with early music of Serbia and their 6th album overall. It is a collaborative album with another ensemble called "Rukovet". The music represented on the release is a traditional Serbian music in the period of 18th and 19th century.

Vidovdan is actually anniversary of the religious holiday of the same name, the date of special importance to ethnic Serbs: on June 28, 1389, according to the Serbian Orthodox religious tradition, and according to the Serbian romantic (19th century) national identity founding tradition, the Ottoman Empire fought against Serbia in the Battle of Kosovo, and duke Lazar of Serbia was slain in battle. Ottoman Sultan Murad I was killed by the Serbian knight Miloš Obilić.

Content
The Serbs in Vojvodina (within the borders of the Habsburg empire) once again became involved in European musical trends in the eighteenth century, but they did not forget their traditional roots. The patrons of iconostases, portraits and still life paintings also enjoyed music which set itself apart from oriental models. Even so, little is known about ecclesiastical and secular music of that time. The citizenry was becoming musically educated at that time. The centre of folk music was Irig, where gusle players would gather from far and wide. Serbian music developed wherever the Serbs lived in the nineteenth century, in Serbia and the Austro-Hungarian cities where the Serbs had settled, and there were centres in Belgrade and in towns all over Vojvodina. The period itself was earmarked by amateurism, but Serbian music of the Romanticist style began then, based on the folk melodies. Apart from native Serbian musicians, the rise of music was also contributed to by foreigners, especially the Czechs, who were choir leaders in Serbian singing societies, playing in orchestras and teaching in the Serbian schools.
The music was mostly in the service of patriotic ideas and of the preservation of the nation, as indicated by the ecclesiastical performances of the time (concerts with mixed programmes—choral, soloist and orchestra compositions, including dramatic pieces as well) which were put together by church choir societies, the pillars of Serbian musical life. Choral music reached its peak in Pančevo in the 1870s, and did the same in Belgrade, Subotica and Kikinda in the 1880s.

Track listing
All tracks produced by Ensemble Renaissance

Personnel
The following people contributed to Vidovdan

Ljudmila Gross-Marić  - soprano
Vojka Đorđević  - soprano
Dragan Mlađenović  - horn, salpinx, tenor
Georges Grujić  - cow-horn, zurna

References

1989 albums
Ensemble Renaissance albums